Ivy Duke (9 June 1896, Kensington, London – 8 November 1937, London) was a British actress. She was married to the actor and director Guy Newall with whom she co-starred in several films.

Filmography
 The March Hare (1919)
 The Double Life of Mr. Alfred Burton (1919)
 I Will (1919)
 Fancy Dress (1919)
 The Garden of Resurrection (1919)
 Duke's Son (1920)
 The Lure of Crooning Water (1920)
 Testimony (1920)
 The Bigamist (1921)
 The Persistent Lovers (1922)
 Boy Woodburn (1922)
 Fox Farm (1922)
 A Maid of the Silver Sea (1922)
 The Starlit Garden (1923)
 The Great Prince Shan (1924)
 Decameron Nights (1924)
 A Knight in London (1929)

References

External links

1896 births
1937 deaths
English film actresses
English silent film actresses
People from Kensington
20th-century English actresses